Philip Short (born 17 April 1945) is a British journalist and author.

He was born in Bristol. He studied at Queens' College, Cambridge. After graduation, he spent from 1967 to 1973 as a freelance journalist, first in Malawi, then in Uganda. He then joined the BBC as a foreign correspondent. He worked there for 25 years. He is the author of several books, among them the biographies of Hastings Banda, Mao Zedong, Pol Pot, François Mitterrand, and Vladimir Putin.

He presented a TV documentary on Mao Zedong entitled "Mao's Bloody Revolution Revealed" on the UK terrestrial station Five in May 2007.

Bibliography 

 The Dragon and the Bear: Inside China and Russia Today (1982).
 Mao: A Life (1999).
 Pol Pot: History of a Nightmare (2005). Published in the U.S. as Pol Pot: Anatomy of a Nightmare (2006).
 Mitterrand: A Study in Ambiguity (2013). Published in the U.S. as A Taste for Intrigue: The Multiple Lives of François Mitterrand (2014).
 Mao: The Man Who Made China (2017).
 Putin: His Life and Times. Published in the U.S. as Putin (2022).

References

External links
 Interview about Pol Pot
 Video of Short meeting Chinese refugees returning from Vietnam, BBC News video report from August 1978

Booknotes interview with Short on Mao: A Life, 2 April 2000.

British male journalists
BBC newsreaders and journalists
1945 births
Living people
British biographers
20th-century biographers
21st-century biographers
20th-century British male writers
Alumni of Queens' College, Cambridge
Male biographers